Kratovo is a municipality in eastern part of North Macedonia. Kratovo is also the name of the town where the municipal seat is found. The municipality is part of the Northeastern Statistical Region.

Geography
The municipality borders Staro Nagoričane Municipality and Kriva Palanka Municipality to the north, Kočani Municipality to the east, Kumanovo Municipality to the west and Probištip Municipality to the south.

Demographics
According to the 2021 Macedonian census, Kratovo Municipality has 7,545 residents. Ethnic groups in the municipality:

Inhabited places

References

External links
Official website

 
Northeastern Statistical Region
Municipalities of North Macedonia